20 Grandes Exitos is the second Compilation album by Argentine rock and ska band Los Fabulosos Cadillacs, released in 1998. It is a two-CDs set covering 8 years and 6 albums plus a never-released song "Igual a Quien"

Reception
The Allmusic review by Stephen Thomas Erlewine awarded the album 4 stars stating "20 Grandes Exitos is an excellent collection of newly-recorded versions of Los Fabulosos Cadillacs' best and best-known songs that should serve as a good introduction for the curious. ".

Track listing

Disc one

Disc two

Personnel 
 Vicentico – vocals
 Flavio Cianciarulo – bass
 Anibal Rigozzi – guitar
 Mario Siperman – keyboards
 Fernando Ricciardi – drums
 Naco Goldfinger – tenor saxophone
 Sergio Rotman – alto saxophone
 Daniel Lozano – trumpet & flugelhorn

Technical personnel 
Bernardo Ernesto  Bergeret  – producer
Fabian Couto – art coordinator, director, producer
Chris Frantz – director, producer
K.C. Porter – art direction, producer
Tina Weymouth – director, producer
Carlos Jorge Yñurrigarro – director, producer

References

External links 
 
20 Grandes Exitos at MusicBrainz (Disc one)
20 Grandes Exitos at MusicBrainz (Disc two)
[ 20 Grandes Exitos] at Allmusic

Los Fabulosos Cadillacs compilation albums
1998 greatest hits albums
Spanish-language compilation albums
Sony Music compilation albums